Jorge López Marco (born 23 November 1978), known as Tote, is a Spanish retired footballer who played as a forward.

He amassed Segunda División totals of 187 games and 31 goals over the course of six seasons, almost exclusively with Hércules. In La Liga he appeared for Real Madrid, Valladolid, Betis, Málaga and Hércules, adding 88 matches and ten goals in a 15-year professional career.

Club career
After beginning his football grooming with Atlético Madrid, Madrid-born Tote moved crosstown in 1993, joining Real Madrid's youth ranks. Playing mainly with its B-side after having begun with Real Madrid C, he received his first-team debut on 8 May 1999, as a late substitute in a 2–3 away loss against Real Sociedad.

After an unsuccessful loan stint in Portugal with S.L. Benfica, Tote was definitely promoted to the main squad, but only appeared in three games during the season as Real were crowned champions. The following year he was again loaned, now to Real Valladolid, and developed into a La Liga player, scoring his first goal against Málaga CF on 16 September 2001 (2–1 away win); one month later he added a hat-trick, in a 4–1 triumph at Athletic Bilbao.

Returning to Real, Tote only made one league appearance, at Recreativo de Huelva, being subsequently sold to Real Betis on a five-year contract. Injuries and loss of form soon made him surplus to requirements and, during the 2005 January transfer window, he was loaned to neighbouring Málaga, where he failed to produce.

After a quick return spell with Valladolid, Tote signed a two-year link with another second division club, Hércules CF. In the 2009–10 campaign he contributed with four goals in 35 matches (2,439 minutes) as the Alicante team returned to the top division, after 13 years.

In early March 2011, during the second half of an eventual 1–2 home loss to UD Almería, Tote suffered a severe knee injury from which he never fully recovered. Hércules was eventually relegated as 19th, and he retired in the summer of 2012 at the age of 33 after not having his contract renewed.

Honours
Real Madrid
La Liga: 2000–01, 2002–03

References

External links

1978 births
Living people
Footballers from Madrid
Spanish footballers
Association football forwards
La Liga players
Segunda División players
Segunda División B players
Tercera División players
Real Madrid C footballers
Real Madrid Castilla footballers
Real Madrid CF players
Real Valladolid players
Real Betis players
Málaga CF players
Hércules CF players
Primeira Liga players
S.L. Benfica footballers
Spanish expatriate footballers
Expatriate footballers in Portugal
Spanish expatriate sportspeople in Portugal